Mount Warlow Glacier is a small glacier located in the Sierra Nevada Range within Kings Canyon National Park in the U.S. state of California.

See also
List of glaciers in the United States

References

Glaciers of California
Glaciers of the Sierra Nevada (United States)
Glaciers of Fresno County, California